Larry Sellers (October 2, 1949 – December 9, 2021) was an Osage American actor and stuntman.

Background 
Sellers was born in Pawhuska, Oklahoma, where he grew up. After graduating high school, he joined the US Navy.

Acting career 
Sellers commonly portrayed Native American characters such as his role as Cloud Dancing on Dr. Quinn, Medicine Woman. For his time on Dr. Quinn, Sellers is credited as the show's Native American Consultant. His other roles included the "Naked Indian" spirit from Wayne's World 2.

Language advocacy 
Sellers was an Osage language instructor at the Osage Language Department and ceremonial leader.

Death 
Sellers died on December 9, 2021, at the age of 72.

Filmography

Film

Television

References

External links
 
 

1949 births
2021 deaths
People from Pawhuska, Oklahoma
20th-century American male actors
21st-century American male actors
American male television actors
American male film actors
Male actors from Oklahoma
Native American language revitalization
Native American male actors
Native American actors
Osage people
United States Navy sailors